Safa Park (in Arabic: حديقة الصفا) is a  urban park located in Dubai, United Arab Emirates. The park is bordered by Sheikh Zayed Road, Al Wasl Road, Al Hadiqa Street, and 55th Street. There was some demolition here many years ago.

History of Safa Park 
Created in 1975, Safa Park was located on the outskirts of Dubai. Prior to its creation, the area was inhabited by illegal immigrants from South Asia. They lived in makeshift homes without running water.  The Dubai government [Mohammed bin Rashid Al Maktoum] turned its  head from these illegal immigrants due to the need for their labor.  The immigrants were later given amnesty and expelled from the immediate area for the creation of the park.

Development of Safa Park 
After being a destination for Dubai's residents for nine years, the park went under redevelopment in 1984. Another redevelopment occurred between 1989 and 1992. The first redevelopment included the addition of sanitary utilities and an indoor playground. The latter development delivered recreational and service facilities to the park. Due to Dubai's rapid growth, skyscrapers are now approaching the park's doorstep.

Flora and Fauna of Safa Park 
The park contains three lakes, over 200 species of birds, and 16,924 different trees and bushes.  Within the park, is grass (which covers around 80% of the park), a small forest, and a hill.  A waterfall flows out of the hill and into a nearby lake.
There are four entrances to the park, all from nearby roads.

Dubai Fitness Challenge 
Dubai Fitness challenge was inaugurated by Dubai Crown prince at time Shaikh Hamdan bin Mohammad bin Rashid Al Maktoum. This fitness challenge lasted for one month and started on October 20, 2017. The challenge end on 18 November 2017. The park was closed for one week before challenge for preparation and renovation of park.

Sports in Safa Park 
The Safa park have sports activities like Long tennis, Cycling, Football and Volleyball.

Flea Market 
Flea Market open every first Saturday of month in Safa Park. The Flea market is going popular with time where one can sell unusable items to other people who have use for it.

See also

List of parks in Dubai

References

External links
 Safa Park Details

1975 establishments in the United Arab Emirates
Parks in Dubai